Ahmad Ouachit is a Moroccan alpine skier. He competed in the men's giant slalom at the 1984 Winter Olympics.

References

Year of birth missing (living people)
Living people
Moroccan male alpine skiers
Olympic alpine skiers of Morocco
Alpine skiers at the 1984 Winter Olympics
Place of birth missing (living people)
20th-century Moroccan people